The Jiaxing Power Station is a state-owned 5000 megawatt coal fired power station owned by Zhejiang Energy Group Co Ltd in Zhejiang. The $15.78 billion plant is situated in Jiaxing. With an installed capacity of 5,000 MW, it is the 7th largest coal-fired power station in the world. (It shares this title with the Guodian Beilun, Guohua Taishan, and Waigaoqiao power stations).
The plant consists of two 300MW sub-critical units, four 600MW super-critical units and two 1000MW ultra-supercritical units, which combined form the 5000MW plant.

References

Coal-fired power stations in China